The 2008–09 Israeli Women's Cup (Gvia HaMedina Nashim) was the 11th season of Israel's women's nationwide football cup competition.

The competition was won, for the 7th consecutive time, by Maccabi Holon who had beaten ASA Tel Aviv University 4–2 in the final.

Results

First round

Quarter-finals

Semi-finals

Final

References
2008–09 State Cup Women Israeli Football Association 

Israel Women's Cup seasons
cup
Israel